George Kunz (born July 5, 1947) is a former American football offensive lineman in the National Football League from 1969–1978 and 1980 with the Atlanta Falcons 1969–1974 and Baltimore Colts 1975-1978 & 1980.

He is now an attorney practicing in Las Vegas, Nevada.

College career 
Tackle at the University of Notre Dame, he was 1968 consensus First-team All-American and a member of 1966 Notre Dame national championship team. He was a two-year starter at right offensive tackle and co-captain of Irish team in 1968. In addition he was National Football Foundation Scholar-Athlete honoree in 1968, being voted Academic All-American in 1968 and winner of NCAA post-graduate scholarship.

NFL career 
Kunz was selected in the 1st Round of the 1969 NFL Draft by the Falcons with the 2nd overall selection. In 1975, Kunz was traded to the Colts along with the Falcons first-round pick in the 1975 NFL Draft (No. 3 overall) for the Colts first round pick (No. 1 overall pick-used to select QB Steve Bartkowski) and a sixth-round pick. 

Kunz established himself as one of the premier offensive linemen of his generation, being named to the Pro Bowl team 7 times (1969, 1971-73. 1975-77) in a 9-year span. In addition, Kunz was named All-Pro in 1972, 1973 and 1975, 2nd Team All-Pro in 1976 & 1977. Kunz was also All-Conference in 1973, 1975, 1976, and 1977 and 2nd team All-Conference in 1972 and 1974.  He was named as the Seagram's Seven Crowns of Sports Offensive Lineman of the Year in both 1976 and 1977 and was selected as the AFC choice for the NFLPA/Coca-Cola Offensive Lineman of the Year Award in 1976.

The Professional Football Researchers Association named Kunz to the PRFA Hall of Very Good Class of 2014

References

1947 births
Living people
People from Fort Sheridan, Illinois
Players of American football from Illinois
All-American college football players
American football offensive linemen
Notre Dame Fighting Irish football players
Atlanta Falcons players
Baltimore Colts players
Western Conference Pro Bowl players
National Conference Pro Bowl players
American Conference Pro Bowl players
National Football League announcers